Dona Nostra is an album by jazz trumpeter Don Cherry with Bobo Stenson and Lennart Åberg recorded in 1993 and released on the ECM label. The album was Cherry's last as a leader prior to his death in 1995.

Reception

The AllMusic review by Scott Yanow awarded the album 3 stars stating "Although there is not much variety in mood, it is a pleasure to hear Cherry stretching out a bit on trumpet (leaving his flute at home) this late in his career".  

The authors of The Penguin Guide to Jazz Recordings wrote: "There are sparks of brilliance here, but they are lost in ashpits of compromise." However, they noted: "The sound is magnificent, and Stenson demonstrates once again what a superbly responsive player he is, and Åberg amply justifies his shared credit."

Writer Michael Stephans described the album as "a beautifully wrought project," and commented: "the music... is rather pensive throughout, but showcases [Cherry's] lyrical quality... the moods and themes... are perhaps fitting in their expansive serenity, given that it was essentially Don Cherry's final recording as a leader."

Tyran Grillo, writing for Between Sound and Space, called Dona Nostra "an album of incredible subtlety to be savored."

Track listing
All compositions by Don Cherry, Bobo Stenson, Lennart Åberg, Anders Jormin, Anders Kjellberg and Okay Temiz except as indicated
 "In Memoriam" (Åberg) - 7:48   
 "Fort Cherry" - 6:34   
 "Arrows" - 5:16   
 "M'Bizo" (Åberg) - 8:38   
 "Race Face" (Ornette Coleman) - 4:22   
 "Prayer" (Jormin, Kjellberg, Cherry, Temiz) - 4:53   
 "What Reason Could I Give" (Coleman) - 3:44   
 "Vienna" - 5:26   
 "Ahayu-da" - 9:14  
Recorded at Rainbow Studio in Oslo, Norway in March 1993

Personnel
Don Cherry — trumpet
Lennart Åberg — soprano saxophone, tenor saxophone, alto flute
Bobo Stenson — piano
Anders Jormin — bass
Anders Kjellberg — drums
Okay Temiz — percussion

References

ECM Records albums
Don Cherry (trumpeter) albums
1994 albums
Albums produced by Manfred Eicher